Off the Highway is a 1925 American silent drama film directed by Tom Forman and starring William V. Mong, Marguerite De La Motte and John Bowers.

Cast
 William V. Mong as Caleb Fry / Tatterly 
 Marguerite De La Motte as Ella Tarrant 
 John Bowers as Donald Brett 
 Charles K. Gerrard as Hector Kindon 
 Gino Corrado as Rabbitt 
 Charles A. Post as Grizzly Bear 
 Josef Swickard as Master 
 Bowditch M. Turner as Student

References

Bibliography
 Goble, Alan. The Complete Index to Literary Sources in Film. Walter de Gruyter, 1999.

External links

1925 films
1925 drama films
Silent American drama films
Films directed by Tom Forman
American silent feature films
1920s English-language films
American black-and-white films
Producers Distributing Corporation films
1920s American films